Rebecca was launched at Charleston in 1802, possibly under another name. She first appeared in online British sources in 1805. In 1805, Rebecca began a voyage as a slave ship in the triangular trade in enslaved people but fell prey to Spanish privateers after she had embarked captives.

Career
Rebecca first appeared in Lloyd's Register in 1805.

Captain William Thompson sailed from Liverpool on 18 March 1805. He acquired captives at Loango and Cabinda.

Fate
They were among the seven vessels off the Congo River that had fallen prey to a privateer. The privateer was described as being of 22 guns and 350 men. Rebeccas captor sent her to the River Plate.

A second report named the captors as L'Orient, of 14 guns, and Dromedario, of 22 guns. The captured vessels arrived in the River Plate before 12 November.

Spanish records report that in June 1805, Viceroy Sobremonte, of Argentina, issued two letters of marque, one for Dolores (24 guns), Currand, master, and Berro y Errasquin, owner, and one for Dromedario (20 guns), Hippolito Mordel, master, and Canuerso y Masini, owner. The two sailed for the African coast, looking to capture enslaving ships. In three months of cruising Dolores captured three ships and one brig, carrying a total 600 enslaved people. Dromedario captured five ships, carrying a total of 500 enslaved people.

Rebeccas entry in the 1806 volume of the Register of Shipping (S), carried the annotation "Captured".

In 1805, 30 British slave ships were lost. Thirteen were lost on the coast of Africa. During the period 1793 to 1807, war, rather than maritime hazards or slave resistance, was the greatest cause of vessel losses among British slave vessels.

Notes

Citations

References
  
 

1802 ships
Ships built in the United States
Liverpool slave ships
Captured ships